is a Japanese manga written and illustrated by Taiyō Matsumoto.

Release
A seinen manga, GoGo Monster was published by Shogakukan in a single tankōbon volume on October 23, 2000. The release of an English-language version of GoGo Monster was announced by Viz Media in February 2009; the publisher released it on November 17, 2009.

Reception

GoGo Monster won the Special Award at the 30th Japan Cartoonists Association Award in 2001. In 2006, the manga earned a nomination for Angoulême International Comics Festival Prize for Artwork, which it lost to Le vol du corbeau by Jean-Pierre Gibrat. It was nominated to the 2009 Los Angeles Times Book Prize for Best Graphic Novel but David Mazzucchelli's Asterios Polyp won it.

The manga was generally received positively by critics, including Deb Aoki of About.com, Joseph Luster of Otaku USA, Oliver Ho of PopMatters, Publishers Weekly, and Shaenon K. Garrity. Erin Finnegan of Anime News Network called it "one of the best manga of 2009." The Comics Reporter staff elected it the 9th best comic of the year.

References

External links

2000 manga
Horror anime and manga
Mystery anime and manga
Seinen manga
Shogakukan manga
Supernatural anime and manga
Taiyō Matsumoto
Viz Media manga